George W. Mavety (died August 19, 2000, aged 63) was an American magazine publisher mainly known for his company Mavety Media Group, which published both gay and straight pornographic magazines. Later in his career, his interests shifted to real estate.

Early life 

Born in Newboro, Ontario (Canada), Mavety worked as a teacher in Canada before becoming involved in the distribution of pornographic magazines, through a company called Trojan Distributing Company.

Brief history of the Mavety publishing empire 

In 1974, Mavety took over the distribution of a short-lived gay magazine called Dilettante, which was edited by John Devere. When Dilettante folded after just a few issues, Mavety offered Devere his support for a new magazine. A self-identified straight man who was married several times and had 13 or 14 children, Mavety "was a visionary" who felt that after the legalization of full frontal male nudity, there was a profitable market for gay magazines. The new magazine was called Mandate, and its first issue appeared in March, 1975. It was initially conceived as a somewhat "artsy" publication, with "beautiful layouts & interviews of the arts." Its subtitle was "Entertainment and Eros for Renaissance Men." Over time, Mavety added many other magazines to his list of gay pornographic publications, magazines such as Inches, Black Inches, Latin Inches, Honcho, and Playguy. Mavety also published straight magazines like Juggs and Leg Show.

Although in the early 1990s, Mavety Media's gay publications were becoming a drain on the company's finances, Mavety vowed "never to shut down." Nine years after Mavety's death in 2000, however, the company had to discontinue its gay titles.

Personality 

There are conflicting reports regarding Mavety's personality. Whereas John Michael Cox, Jr., warns against "canoniz[ing] George as the patron saint of the Gay Press," depicting him as a hard-nosed businessman, Dian Hanson, who worked with him for many years and delivered the eulogy at his burial, describes him in the warmest terms. She reports how "tears burst out," and he "sobbed into his hands" over the AIDS deaths of many of his associates and employees. Hanson also notes that "every employee that got sick was kept on full salary." Mavety contributed to many charitable organizations, such as the American Civil Liberties Union, Amnesty International, the Caron Foundation, the English-Speaking Union, the Friars Club of New York, the Hellenic Plato Lodge o. 1129, and the National Coalition Against the Death Penalty.

References 

Year of birth unknown
2000 deaths
Adult magazine publishers (people)
American pornographers
Free speech activists
American magazine founders
People from Leeds and Grenville United Counties
Canadian magazine founders